Big Trouble in Little China is a soundtrack produced by John Carpenter for the film of the same name.

With the soundtrack, Carpenter wanted to avoid the usual clichés finding that “other scores for American movies about Chinese characters are basically rinky tink, chop suey music. [He] didn't want that for Big Trouble”. Carpenter instead opted for his trademark synthesizer score mixed with rock ‘n’ roll music.

A soundtrack album, produced by Carpenter, was released in 1986 on Enigma Records and featured nine tracks for a total of just over 45 minutes. In 1999, an expanded edition was released by Super Tracks Music Group. It included two versions of Carpenter and his band, The Coupe De Villes (consisting of himself, Nick Castle, and Tommy Lee Wallace), performing the "Big Trouble in Little China" theme song, three tracks from Alan Howarth's previously unreleased score for Backstabbed (also known as Mørkeleg), and a track from Escape from New York, entitled, "Atlanta Bank Robbery".

Track listing

1999 release

Both the 1986 release and 1999 release are out-of-print.

2009/2016 releases

In 2009, a complete 2CD limited edition of the soundtrack was released by La-La Land Records which includes every note of music from the film, including both versions of the title song, remastered. In 2016, it was re-released as part of the film's 30th anniversary, with new artwork and packaging. Both versions have an error on Pork Chop Express on the intro, it plays slightly fast, then slows down to its normal speed. The original 1986 versions don't have this error, this is because the 2009 and 2016 CD's are mastered from the film's audio master, rather than the original master tapes. This is also audibly evident in the film too.

Personnel
 John Carpenter – composition, performance, production
 Alan Howarth - synthesizer programming, sequencing, editing, recording

The Coupe De Villes
 John Carpenter
 Nick Castle
 Tommy Lee Wallace

References 

John Carpenter soundtracks
1986 soundtrack albums
Enigma Records albums
La-La Land Records soundtracks
Comedy film soundtracks
Fantasy film soundtracks